Non-exhaust emissions come from wearing down motor vehicle brake pads, tires, roads themselves, and unsettling of particles on the road.  This particulate matter is made up of micrometre-sized particles and causes negative health effects, including respiratory disease and cancer.  Very fine particulate matter has been linked to cardiovascular disease.

Studies have shown that non-exhaust emissions of particles from vehicles can be greater than particles due to exhaust.

Types of emissions
Brake wear gets released into the air as particulate matter.
Particles on the road get thrown or blown into the air.
Rubber pollution gets released into the air.
The road itself wears and releases particulate matter into the air.

Ways of reducing emissions 
Better regulation of tires has been suggested. Lighter vehicles pollute less.

Electric and hybrid vehicles 
Electric vehicles and hybrid vehicles with regenerative braking still unsettle particles on the roadway and give off rubber and road pollution, and do so at a higher rate than lighter internal combustion vehicles, but do not emit the same level of brake wear compared to vehicles of the same type.

Regulatory agencies and policies that target exhaust emissions
Very few agencies are charged with implementing exhaust emission standards for non-exhaust emissions.  Most policies target exhaust emissions and do not regulate non-exhaust particulate matter emissions. As of February 2023 Euro 7 standards are still being argued about.

See also
Air quality law
European emission standards
Exhaust gas
Ontario's Drive Clean
Partial zero-emissions vehicle
Phase-out of fossil fuel vehicles
Roadway air dispersion modeling
United States vehicle emission standards
Vehicle emission standard
Vehicle inspection

References

Air pollution
Pollution
Transport and the environment